The Idaho Department of Labor is a state agency in Idaho. The agency is responsible for economic development, labor relations, workforce, technology, volunteerism, and workforce development. It also processes requests for unemployment benefits and unemployment insurance. The agency is managed by the Idaho Director of Labor who is selected by the governor of Idaho.

References 

State departments of labor of the United States
State agencies of Idaho